The Quiet Season is a 1965 Australian television short. It aired on the Australian Broadcasting Commission and was produced in the studios of their Brisbane station (ABQ).

It was the fourth play produced at the ABC's Brisbane studios at Toowong, following Vacancy at Vaughan Street, Dark Brown and Ring Out Wild Bells.

Plot
Set during the off-season in an Australian fishing town, Shell Bay, "somewhere near Melbourne". A guest house has only one boarder, Harry Nichols. He meets a spinster, Madge, likes her, but flees marriage,   returns the next year more determined and finds her unhappily married to someone else, Bill Martin. The guest house is run by Mrs Gray, who is married to Bert and has a daughter Sue.

Cast
Nonie Stewart as the local shopkeeper Madge
John Nash as school teacher Harry Nichols
Reg Cameron as Bill Martin
Betty Ross as Mrs Gray
Elaine Cusick as Sue Gray
Donald McTaggart as Madge's brother Don
Vic Hughes as Mrs Gray's husband Bert

Production
It was produced by John Croyston and written by Melbourne writer John Cameron. The outdoor scenes were filmed at Woody Point. Croyston did a location scout of Brisbane's northern suburbs before selecting Woody Point. Beach scenes were shot near Margate.

It was Nonie Stewart's first part since returning from overseas in July 1964. She had left Brisbane for Canada in 1957 and performed in more than fifty shows in Vancouver. The only non local member of the cast was Vic Hughes who was a presenter of Partyland. Filming took place in April 1965.

Elaine Cusick was a Brisbane actor who had worked extensively in radio and appeared in TV productions of The Mystery of the Hansom Cab and The One Day of the Year. She had recently returned from an 18 month trip overseas and was going to go to Melbourne when she received an offer to audition for The Quiet Season. It was the first TV role for Reg Cameron and John Nash.

Reception
Air dates varied including 28 June in Canberra and 29 June in Melbourne. Another Brisbane shot play was shown the same week, Ring Out Wild Bells.

The Sydney Morning Herald noted it was the fourth television play to be produced by ABC's Brisbane station, and called it "a horror", comparing it highly unfavourably with the "slick, high professional and sometimes world-class productions" being produced in Sydney at the time.

The Age thought Nash and Stewart "played their parts competently" but felt "it was distracting how abruptly one scene changed into the next. This faulty technique gave a measure of jerkiness to an otherwise smooth performance."

The Bulletin said "Intelligently produced by John Croyston, it [the show] had   everything but a good  time-slot. It was buried after the late  news. The duty   announcer   urged   viewers  to stay up for it,  and I hope some did.  They would   have   found   that “The  Quiet Season”   was   one   of those   small  plays   requiring   sensitive   management,  and   this Croyston achieved   in   a   masterly  way.   He   also   used  outside   film   of   trees, rocks   and   waves   to   suggest   the   locale,  passages   of   time,   even   action   which   had  occurred.  The story... is   not   wildly   dramatic material,  nor  a   new   plot,   but   it   has   poignant, bitter  sweet possibilities,   and,   for   once,   these  were   fully   realised   by   the camera   and  the   actors.   Often,   darting   close-ups   were  used   to   catch   a   fleeting   expression,   a  small,   quick   gesture.   Croyston,   better  known   for   his   radio   productions,   will  be   worth   watching   as   a   television   man."

Status
The National Archives of Australia hold a film copy of this TV short under the title Quiet Season (without the "the"), with 7 May 1965 given as the date, and a running time of 28:46, and notes it has been digitised.

See also
 Vacancy in Vaughn Street
Dark Brown (1963)
The Monkey Cage (1965)
Ring Out Wild Bells (1964)
The Absence of Mr Sugden (1965)
Arabesque for Atoms (1965)
A Sleep of Prisoners (1961)
Crisis (1963)
Dear Edgar (1964)

References

External links
The Quiet Season on IMDb
Publicity information (digitised) at National Archives of Australia

1965 television films
1965 films
1960s Australian television plays
Australian television films
Australian Broadcasting Corporation original programming
English-language television shows
Black-and-white Australian television shows